Göran Holter (born 16 November 1963) is a retired Swedish football striker.

References

1963 births
Living people
Swedish footballers
Degerfors IF players
IFK Norrköping players
SK Brann players
Karlstad BK players
BK Olympic players
Association football forwards
Swedish expatriate footballers
Expatriate footballers in Norway
Swedish expatriate sportspeople in Norway
Allsvenskan players
Eliteserien players